Charles William Jefferys  (August 25, 1869 – October 8, 1951), also known as C. W. Jefferys, was a Canadian painter, illustrator,  author, and teacher, best known as a historical illustrator.

Biography
Jefferys was born in Rochester, England. He moved with his family first to Philadelphia, then to Hamilton, Ontario, and finally to Toronto around 1880. There he attended school and was apprenticed with the York Lithography Company from 1885 to 1890.

Career
From 1889 to 1892 Jefferys worked for the Toronto Globe as an illustrator and artist. He produced artwork for several printing companies. From 1893 to 1901, he worked for the New York Herald. Returning to Toronto, he became a newspaper, magazine and book illustrator, appearing in numerous publications, including Hardware Merchandising.

Jefferys created a series of illustrations and essays for the Toronto Star Weekly, which in 1920 were published as Dramatic Episodes in Canada's Story. The following year he was chosen by the Ontario government to illustrate a textbook, Ontario Public School History of Canada, written by George Wrong.

Along with Ivor Lewis and other artists, Jefferys co-founded the Graphic Arts Club (later named the Canadian Society of Graphic Art), which by the 1940s became one of the primary artists' groups in Canada.  As well, from 1912 to 1939, he taught painting and drawing in the Department of Architecture at the University of Toronto. During World War I he was commissioned by the Canadian War Records department to paint soldiers training at Camp Petawawa and  Niagara. Jefferys had an interest in history and he produced accurate and meticulous portrayals of early Canadian life. The best known collection of his historical sketches is the three volume The Picture Gallery of Canadian History (c. 1942–1960). In 1926, he was made a member of the Royal Canadian Academy of Arts. He also was a member of the Ontario Society of Artists and the Canadian Society of Painters in Water Colour.  Jefferys was a founding member of the Arts and Letters Club of Toronto and was its president from 1923 to 1924.

Death and legacy
Soon after Jefferys's death in 1952, more than 1,000 of his drawings were sold to the Imperial Oil Company, which in 1972 donated the collection to Library and Archives Canada. A plaque at 4111 Yonge Street, where he died, quotes him as saying,

 "If my work has stirred any interest in our country and its past, I am more than paid".

Jefferys received numerous awards, including an honorary Doctor of Laws degree from Queen’s University in 1934. C. W. Jefferys Collegiate Institute, a public high school in Toronto, is named for him. There are works by him in the art collection of the Royal Military College of Canada the National Gallery of Canada, and the Art Gallery of Ontario. A statue of Jefferys, created by Adrienne Alison, has been installed in York Mills Valley Park. Jeffreys has been designated as an Historic Person in the Directory of Federal Heritage Designations.

Gallery

See also
 Canadian official war artists
 War artist
 War art

References

Bibliography 
 
 Stacey, Robert. Charles William Jefferys 1869-1951. Kingston, Ontario: Hanson & Edgar, 1976.

External links

 
 
 
 Jefferys at The Canadian Encyclopedia
 CWJefferys.ca, run by the artist's grandson
 Books which discuss his work
 "C.W. Jefferys: Picturing Canada" television documentary
 C.W. Jefferys at theCanadaSite
 info on Picture Gallery of Canadian History
 excerpt from Picture Gallery of Canadian History
 from Archives of Ontario
 Historical Plaques at TorontoHistory
Charles W. Jefferys and Jean Adams Jefferys fonds at the National Gallery of Canada, Ottawa, Ontario.

1869 births
1951 deaths
19th-century Canadian painters
Canadian male painters
20th-century Canadian painters
Canadian illustrators
English emigrants to Canada
People from Rochester, Kent
Academic staff of the University of Toronto
Persons of National Historic Significance (Canada)
Canadian war artists
Members of the Royal Canadian Academy of Arts
World War I artists
19th-century Canadian male artists
20th-century Canadian male artists